Suillia longipennis is a species of fly in the family Heleomyzidae. It is found in North America.

References

Further reading

External links

 

Heleomyzidae
Insects described in 1862
Taxa named by Hermann Loew